Dyson Falzon (born 9 March 1986) is a professional footballer who plays as a midfielder.

Falzon has also earned one cap for Malta, appearing in a 3–0 loss to Slovakia on 15 August 2006.

Honours

Valletta
Maltese Premier League: 2007–08

References

External links
 Dyson Falzon at MaltaFootball.com
 
 

Living people
1986 births
Maltese footballers
Sirens F.C. players
Mosta F.C. players
Valletta F.C. players
Ħamrun Spartans F.C. players
Gżira United F.C. players
Mqabba F.C. players
Maltese Premier League players
Competitors at the 2005 Mediterranean Games
Association football midfielders
Malta youth international footballers
Malta under-21 international footballers
Malta international footballers
Mediterranean Games competitors for Malta